The badminton men's singles tournament at the 2016 Summer Olympics took place from 11 to 20 August at Riocentro - Pavilion 4. The seeding was decided on 21 July 2016.

The event was won by the reigning world champion, China's Chen Long who defeated Lee Chong Wei of Malaysia who was also runner up to Chen at the 2015 World Championships. This was Lee's third consecutive Olympic silver medal. In the bronze-medal match Denmark's Viktor Axelsen defeated Lin Dan of China.

Competition format 

The tournament started with a group phase round-robin followed by a knockout stage.

Seeds 
A total of 13 players were given seeds.

  (silver medalist)
  (gold medalist)
  (fourth place)
  (bronze medalist)
  (round of 16)
  (quarter-finals)
  (round of 16)

  (quarter-finals)
  (quarter-finals)
  (round of 16)
  (round of 16)
  (group stage)
  (quarter-finals)

Group stage

Group A

Group C

Group D

Group E

Group G

Group H

Group I

Group J

Group K

Group L

Group M

Group N

Group P 

1 Cordòn was forced to retire from the competition due to an ankle injury he suffered during the third set of his match against Dziółko.

Finals

References 

Badminton at the 2016 Summer Olympics
Men's events at the 2016 Summer Olympics